Finding Favour is a contemporary Christian music band from Vidalia, Georgia. They are on the Gotee Records label, and released their first studio EP entitled Finding Favour EP on March 12, 2013. The EP has achieved positive critical reception. In addition, the EPs two lead singles have seen commercial and radio airplay successes.

Background
In 2005, Finding Favour was formed in Vidalia, Georgia and it consisted of Blake NeeSmith, Allen Dukes, Dustin Daniels, and Ricky Dunn. Nathan Tomberlin joined the band in 2008. Dunn resigned later that year and was replaced by Aaron Tomberlin. Nathan and Aaron resigned in 2012 and soon after Joshua Duckworth joined the band.

Music
In 2012, the band was signed to Gotee Records.

Finding Favour EP
On March 12, 2013, Finding Favour released their eponymously named Finding Favour EP. Finding Favour EP had two singles released from the EP, which were "Slip On By" that charted at a peak of No. 22 on the Billboard Christian Songs chart and "Shake the World" that peaked at No. 27 on the same chart.

Reborn
The band released Reborn as their first studio album, on June 23, 2015 with Gotee Records.

Members
Current
 Blake NeeSmith – vocals 
 Allen Stanford Dukes – guitar
 Joseph Dustin Daniels – bass guitar 
 Joshua Duckworth – drums
Former
 Danny Richard Dunn – vocals, lead guitar
 Nathan Tomberlin - Drums
 Aaron Tomberlin - Guitar, Keys,

Discography

Studio albums

Singles

References

External links
 
 Cross Rhythms interview

Musical groups established in 2005
Gotee Records artists